Jón Magnússon (born 2 April 1948) is an Icelandic former handball player who competed in the 1972 Summer Olympics.

References

1948 births
Living people
Jon Magnusson
Jon Magnusson
Handball players at the 1972 Summer Olympics